Ske or SKE may refer to:
Ske, an Icelandic band
Ske or Seke language, spoken in Vanuatu
Skewen railway station, Wales, National Rail station code
Skien Airport, Geiteryggen,  Norway, IATA code
SKE48, a band in Nagoya, Aichi, Japan